Werner Grissmann (born 21 January 1952) is a retired Austrian alpine skier. He had his best achievements in the downhill event, winning a bronze medal at the 1978 World Championships and placing seventh at the 1980 Winter Olympics. He competed in the FIS Alpine Ski World Cup in 1972–1981 with the best result of eighth place in 1975.

References

External links
 
 

1952 births
Living people
Austrian male alpine skiers
Olympic alpine skiers of Austria
Alpine skiers at the 1980 Winter Olympics
People from Lienz
Sportspeople from Tyrol (state)